Haplos is a 2017 Philippine television drama series, directed by Gil Tejada Jr. starring Sanya Lopez, Thea Tolentino, Rocco Nacino and Pancho Magno. Which premiered on GMA Network's GMA Afternoon Prime block and worldwide on GMA Pinoy TV on July 10, 2017 to February 23, 2018 on the network's Afternoon Prime line up replacing D' Originals.

NUTAM (Nationwide Urban Television Audience Measurement) People in television homes ratings are provided by AGB Nielsen Philippines. The series ended, but its the 33rd-week run, and with a total of 165 episodes. It was replaced by Hindi Ko Kayang Iwan Ka.

Series overview

Episodes

July 2017

August 2017

September 2017

October 2017

November 2017

December 2017

January 2018

February 2018

References

Lists of Philippine drama television series episodes